Kameshwar Pandit was an Indian politician, trade unionist and journalist. Pandit founded the Himachal Pradesh branch of the Communist Party of India in 1953.

Pandit contested the June 3, 1959 Mahasu Lok Sabha seat by-election, standing as an independent politician. Pandit obtained 6,712 votes (8.67%).

Pandit remained in CPI after the 1964 split in the party, and would stay on as the Himachal Pradesh State Council Secretary of CPI until his death. He was a leader of mass organizations like the All India Trade Union Congress and the All India Kisan Sabha. Pandit served as the editor of the weekly Himachal Janata for many years. He also founded the weekly Himachal Darpan and Pahari. He authored several books and worked on a number of periodical publications. He was a member of the CPI National Council.

He was offered the position as state governor by Prime Minister H.D. Deve Gowda, but turned down the offer.

Pandit died in Shimla, from cardiac arrest, on June 29, 2001.

References

2001 deaths
Communist Party of India politicians from Himachal Pradesh
Indian trade union leaders